Granite Island Recreation Park is a protected area including all of Granite Island which is about  south-east of Victor Harbor in South Australia and about  south of Adelaide.  It is reported as being 'the most visited park in South Australia'.  It was proclaimed in 1999 under the National Parks and Wildlife Act 1972 and is categorised as an IUCN Category IV protected area.

See also
 Victor Harbor Horse Drawn Tram

References

External links
 Official webpage
Webpage for the Granite Island Recreation  Park on the Protected Planet website
Friends of Granite Island website

Recreation Parks of South Australia
Protected areas established in 1999
Encounter Bay
1999 establishments in Australia